A Home on the Range: The Jewish Chicken Ranchers of Petaluma is a 2002 documentary by Bonnie Burt and Judith Montell about a group of Jews who fled pogroms in Eastern Europe and prejudice in America.  They organised a socialist society in the rural Northern California town of Petaluma and raised chickens to support themselves.

Summary
A Home on the Range shows old photographs, archival color footage of the idealistic society that once existed in Petaluma and features interviews of former residents. The film reconstructs the daily life in Petaluma and highlights the daily mix of farm work and intellectual activities. United by their culture, the Jews of Petaluma cared for one another as extended family and survived antisemitism pre-World War II and anticommunist sentiments of the McCarthy era. With time, the community dwindled, and today their chicken ranches have been replaced by telecommunication facilities, dairy farms and vineyards.

The film demonstrates that for many of the Jews living in Petaluma, Judaism was more of a culture than a religion. It includes an account of a former resident saying that people kept the holidays for the social attachment, and another stating: “Judaism—there wasn't any!” Burt and Montell show that, for the farmers of Petaluma, Judaism meant less about God and more about speaking Yiddish, eating matzah, and forming a kibbutz. But most of all, it meant they were outsiders to American society because they were often called rude names, discriminated against, and even attacked. As one woman in the film remembers, “they used to call us dirty Jew.” Another woman remembers a particularly frightening night when an antisemitic neighbor threw a barn party and the drunk and rowdy crowd terrified her parents so much that they couldn't sleep that night. There is also an incident when non-Jewish leaders of a neighboring community acted out their antisemitism and anti-communist by attacking some of the men of Petaluma.

The film shows that, after several generations of life in Petaluma, Jewish Americans were no longer persecuted. They assimilated into society, and the vibrant community of chicken ranchers in Petaluma dwindled. One former resident who grew up on a ranch and raised her children on a ranch expresses her mixed feelings about assimilation in the film. She pines for “the core” sense of community attachment that she used to feel, but in exchange admits that she and her neighbors “were accepted as Americans.”

Production
For the past twenty years, Bonnie Burt has been making documentaries about Jewish life. Her films have screened at the Museum of Modern Art and at Lincoln Center in New York.
In 1992, she teamed up with Judy Montell to produce A Home on the Range.

Reception
The San Diego Jewish Film Festival called A Home on the Range a modest film that "reads almost like an epic myth."

See also
Other Documentaries about Jews in America:
My Yiddish Momme McCoy
Awake Zion
From Swastika to Jim Crow
Professional Revolutionary
Song of a Jewish Cowboy

More information on Jewish communes:
Kibbutz
Moshav
Socialism
Israel

Notes

References

External links
 
A Home on the Range's official website
The Petaluma Museum
75th Anniversary of the Jewish Community Center in Petaluma
Petaluma Chamber of Commerce

2002 films
American documentary films
Documentary films about Jews and Judaism in the United States
Documentary films about United States history
Jewish-American history in California
Petaluma, California
Jewish socialism
Socialism in the United States
Films set in the San Francisco Bay Area
History of Sonoma County, California
Documentary films about California
2002 documentary films
Rural Jewish culture
Secular Jewish culture in the United States
2000s English-language films
2000s American films